Blackland is an unincorporated community in Restigouche County, New Brunswick, Canada.

History

Notable people

See also
List of communities in New Brunswick

References

External links
map of area

Communities in Restigouche County, New Brunswick